Mandevilla brachysiphon is a plant species with the common name Huachuca Mountain rocktrumpet. It is native to southern Arizona, southwestern New Mexico, Texas, Chihuahua and Sonora. It grows on rocky slopes and plains ion desert and grassland, often on limestone soil.

This is a low plant rarely attaining a height of over 40 cm. It has white, showy flowers that open at night and are very fragrant.  The seeds are minutely puberulent.

References

brachysiphon
Flora of Arizona
Flora of Texas
Flora of Chihuahua (state)
Flora of Mexico
Flora of New Mexico
Flora of Sonora